New York Skyports Inc. Seaplane base  is a seaplane base in the East River VFR corridor in New York City, located at the foot of East 23rd Street between Waterside Plaza and Stuyvesant Cove Park. A seaplane ramp was constructed at East 23rd Street in the mid-1930s and the seaplane base became part of the marina that opened on April 18, 1962.

Operations
There are no instrument approaches for this airport. Pilots must receive special training and be approved by a member of the North East Seaplanes Pilot's Association and are not permitted to fly over the Queensboro Bridge.

Most operations at the seaplane base occur between May and September, when flights are made for weekend getaways to Fire Island and The Hamptons, although seaplanes can land throughout the year provided that there is no ice in the river.

Airlines and destinations

Passenger

Accidents and incidents
On July 5, 1976, a Cessna 185E crashed into a boat during takeoff. Although the aircraft suffered substantial damage, the pilot was uninjured.
On July 12, 1998, a twin-engine seaplane flipped over after landing near East 29th Street and became submerged in the river. The pilot and two passengers escaped from the plane's emergency windows and were rescued by the police.
On July 21, 2017, a Cessna 208 aborted takeoff due to mechanical failure and damaged a pontoon in a hard river landing. The pilot and nine passengers were rescued by a police vessel. One of the passengers was TV producer Bill Lawrence.

References

External links

Airports in New York City
Seaplane bases in the United States
East River
23rd Street (Manhattan)